Aerobic exercise (also known as endurance activities, cardio or cardio-respiratory exercise) is physical exercise of low to high intensity that depends primarily on the aerobic energy-generating process. "Aerobic" is defined as "relating to, involving, or requiring oxygen", and refers to the use of oxygen to meet energy demands during exercise via aerobic metabolism adequately. Aerobic exercise is performed by repeating sequences of light-to-moderate intensity activities for extended periods of time. Aerobic exercise may be better referred to as "solely aerobic", as it is designed to be low-intensity enough that all carbohydrates are aerobically turned into energy via mitochondrial ATP production. Mitochondrion are organelles that rely on oxygen for the metabolism of carbs, proteins, and fats. Aerobic exercise causes a remodeling of mitochondrial cells within the tissues of the liver and heart.

Examples of cardiovascular or aerobic exercise are medium- to long-distance running or jogging, swimming, cycling, stair climbing and walking.

History 

Archibald Hill, a British physiologist, introduced the concepts of maximal oxygen uptake and oxygen debt in 1922. German physician Otto Meyerhof and Hill shared the 1922 Nobel Prize in Physiology or Medicine for their independent work related to muscle energy metabolism. Building on this work, scientists began measuring oxygen consumption during exercise. Henry Taylor at the University of Minnesota and Scandinavian scientists Per-Olof Åstrand and Bengt Saltin made notable contributions in the 1950s and 60s. Contributions were also made by the Harvard Fatigue Laboratory, Copenhagen Muscle Research Centre as well as various German universities.

After World War II, health-oriented recreational activities such as jogging became popular. The Royal Canadian Air Force Exercise Plans, developed by Dr. Bill Orban and published in 1961, helped to launch modern fitness culture.

Physical therapists Col. Pauline Potts and Dr. Kenneth H. Cooper, both of the United States Air Force, advocated the concept of aerobic exercise. In the 1960s, Cooper started research into preventive medicine. He conducted the first extensive research on aerobic exercise on over 5,000 U.S. Air Force personnel after becoming intrigued by the belief that exercise can preserve one's health. In 1966 he coined the term "aerobics". Two years later, in 1968, he published a book of the same name. In 1970, he created the Cooper Institute for non-profit research and education devoted to preventive medicine. He published a mass-market version of his book The New Aerobics in 1979. Cooper encouraged millions into becoming active and is now known as the "father of aerobics". Cooper's book inspired Jacki Sorensen to create aerobic dancing exercise routines, which grew in popularity in the 1970s in the U.S., and at the same time, Judi Missett developed and expanded Jazzercise.

In the 1970s, there was a running boom. It was inspired by the Olympics, the New-York marathon and the advent of cushioned shoes.

Aerobics at home became popular worldwide after the release of Jane Fonda's Workout exercise video in 1982. Step aerobics was popular in the 1990s, driven by a step product and program from Reebok shoes.

Definition 

Aerobic exercise comprises innumerable forms. In general, it is performed at a moderate level of intensity over a relatively long period of time. For example, running a long distance at a moderate pace is an aerobic exercise, but sprinting is not. Playing singles tennis, with near-continuous motion, is generally considered aerobic activity, while activities with brief bursts of energetic movement within longer periods of casual movement may not be aerobic. Some sports are thus inherently "aerobic", while other aerobic exercises, such as fartlek training or aerobic dance classes, are designed specifically to improve aerobic capacity and fitness. It is most common for aerobic exercises to involve the leg muscles, primarily or exclusively. There are some exceptions. For example, rowing to distances of 2,000 meters or more is an aerobic sport that exercises several major muscle groups, including those of the legs, abdominals, chest, and arms.

Examples
Moderate activities

 Swimming
 Dancing
 Hiking on flat ground
 Bicycling at less than 10 mph
 Moderate walking (about 3.5 mph)
 Downhill skiing
 Tennis (doubles)
 Softball
 Gardening
 Light yard work
Jogging

Vigorous activities

 Brisk walking (about 4.5 mph)
 Bicycling at more than 10 mph
 Hiking uphill
 Cross-country skiing
 Stair climbing
 Soccer
 Jogging
 Jumping rope
 Tennis (singles)
 Basketball
 Heavy yard work

Versus anaerobic exercise 
Aerobic exercise and fitness can be contrasted with anaerobic exercise, of which strength training and short-distance running are the most salient examples. The two types of exercise differ by the duration and intensity of muscular contractions involved, as well as by how energy is generated within the muscle.

New research on the endocrine functions of contracting muscles has shown that both aerobic and anaerobic exercise promote the secretion of myokines, with attendant benefits including growth of new tissue, tissue repair, and various anti-inflammatory functions, which in turn reduce the risk of developing various inflammatory diseases. Myokine secretion in turn is dependent on the amount of muscle contracted, and the duration and intensity of contraction. As such, both types of exercise produce endocrine benefits.

In almost all conditions, anaerobic exercise is accompanied by aerobic (in the presence of oxygen) exercises because the less efficient anaerobic metabolism must supplement the aerobic system due to energy demands that exceed the aerobic system's capacity. During anaerobic exercise, the body must generate energy through other processes than aerobic metabolism, including glycolysis paired with lactic acid fermentation, and the phosphocreatine system to generate energy in the form of ATP. Common kettlebell exercises combine aerobic and anaerobic aspects. Allowing 24 hours of recovery between aerobic and strength exercise leads to greater fitness.

Fuel usage 
Depending on the intensity of exercise, the body preferentially utilizes certain fuel forms to meet energy demands. The two main fuel sources for aerobic exercise in the body include fat (in the form of adipose tissue) and glycogen. At lower intensity aerobic exercise, the body preferentially uses fat as its main fuel source for cellular respiration, however as intensity increases the body preferentially uses glycogen stored in the muscles and liver or other carbohydrates, as it is a quicker source of energy. Aerobic exercise is not a very efficient way to burn fat in comparison to other forms of exercise, as in order to preferentially burn fat one should exercise at lower intensities, which decreases the overall amount of calories burned per unit of time.

Health benefits
Among the recognized health benefits of doing regular aerobic exercise are:

Strengthens the muscles involved in respiration, to facilitate the flow of air in and out of the lungs
Strengthens and enlarges the heart muscle, to improve its pumping efficiency and reduce the resting heart rate, known as aerobic conditioning
Improves circulation efficiency and reducing blood pressure
Increases pain tolerance
Maintains independence in later life
Increases the total number of red blood cells in the body, facilitating transport of oxygen
Improves mental health, including reducing stress and lowering the incidence of depression, as well as increased cognitive capacity.
Slightly reduced depression may also be observed, especially if aerobic exercises are used as additional treatment for patients with a hematological malignancy 
Reduces the risk for diabetes (One meta-analysis has shown, from multiple conducted studies, that aerobic exercise does help lower Hb A1Clevels for type 2 diabetics.)
Moderates the risk of death due to cardiovascular problems
Reduces risk for heart disease, blood clots, and stroke
Lowers total cholesterol
Raises high-density lipoprotein
Promotes weight loss
Prevents bone loss

 Lowers inflammation
 Prevents vascular dysfunction 
 Improves Episodic memory

High-impact aerobic activities (such as jogging or using a skipping rope) can:
 Stimulate bone growth
 Reduce the risk of osteoporosis for both men and women

Disadvantages 
Some drawbacks of aerobic exercise include:

Overuse injuries because of repetitive, high-impact exercise such as distance running
 Not an effective form of fat loss. Beginners may experience a fast fat loss process but experienced practitioners will combine scientific diets and anaerobic exercise to get the ideal outcome
 Aerobic exercise may not be as efficient as other exercise methods for eliciting the same improvements in body composition, cardiovascular health, and overall health. For example, HIIT exercise has been shown to provide the same benefits in a fraction of the time spent exercising per week.

Both the health benefits and the performance benefits, or "training effect", require that the duration and the frequency of exercise both exceed a certain minimum. Most authorities suggest at least twenty minutes performed at least three times per week.

For older adults 
The National Institute on Aging's Go4Life initiative has a YouTube channel with suggested exercises and related materials for older adults.

The NIA recommends a number of measures for safety during aerobic exercise:
 Light activity as a warm up and a cool down.
 Endurance activities should not cause dizziness, chest pain or pressure, or a feeling like heartburn.
 Drinking of liquids while exercising, unless instructed otherwise by a doctor.
 Awareness of your surroundings when exercising outdoors.
 Dressing in layers to allow addition or removal of clothes as needed for hot and cold weather.
 Use of safety equipment, such as a helmet when bicycling, to prevent injuries.

Similar activities
 Higher intensity exercise, such as High-intensity interval training (HIIT), increases the resting metabolic rate (RMR) in the 24 hours following high intensity exercise, ultimately burning more calories than lower intensity exercise; low intensity exercise burns more calories during the exercise, due to the increased duration, but fewer afterwards.

Businesses
Aerobic exercise has long been a popular approach to achieving weight loss and physical fitness, often taking a commercial form.

 In the 1970s, Judi Sheppard Missett helped create the market for commercial aerobics with her Jazzercise program, at the same time as Jacki Sorensen was expanding her system of aerobic dancing.
 In the 1980s, Richard Simmons hosted an aerobic exercise show on television, and followed Jane Fonda's lead by releasing a series of exercise videos.
 In the 1990s, Billy Blanks's Tae Bo helped popularize cardio-boxing workouts that incorporated martial arts movements. Reebok shoes popularized step aerobics with their Reebok Step device and training program.

Types

See also 
5BX, for men
XBX, for women
Aerobics
Anaerobic exercise
High-intensity interval training
Endurance training
Exercise physiology
Neurobiological effects of physical exercise
Cellular respiration

References

Further reading

External links 
 

 
Exercise physiology